Pas de Bellecombe-Jacob is a mountain pass and vista point overlooking Enclos Fouqué, the last caldera formed by Piton de la Fournaise, the active volcano on the eastern side of Réunion island (a French department) in the Indian Ocean. 

It is named after Guillaume Léonard de Bellecombe, governor of La Réunion during the 18th century, and Jacob, the slave that actually discovered the pass.

Location

The Pas de Bellecombe is situated over the caldera rim cliffs, at a 2311 m elevation, and offers a good point of view over the northeast part of the caldera, including a small crater called Formica Leo.

Mountains of Réunion